Jessica Makinson (born November 29, 1978) is an American actress, comedian, and improviser known as a series regular for several Comedy Central programs, for voice-over work for animation, and as a sketch player for late night talk shows.

Early life and career
Makinson graduated from Arizona State University in 2000 with a BA in theater. She then began sketch and improvisation work at ASU. Makinson helped build ASU's Farce Side Comedy Hour and Barren Mind into on-campus hits with her comedic skills. Soon after graduating, Makinson moved to Los Angeles, where she studied at Improv Olympic, going on to become a stand-out performer in groups like Brand X, King Ten, and The Armando Show.

A go-to girl for Trey Parker and Matt Stone, Makinson guest-starred on their political sitcom That's My Bush and has contributed voices to their long-running animated series South Park. She has also contributed sketches and characters to ABC's Jimmy Kimmel Live!, CBS's The Late Late Show with Craig Ferguson, and Showtime's The Underground.

In 2003, Makinson starred in a season of Comedy Central's improv/hidden camera series Trigger Happy TV before landing the role of Eleanor (the weeper) on Spike TV's 2004 reality parody Joe Schmo 2. The following year she starred in two pilots, The Hollywood Show for Comedy Central (playing a mock reporter) and The Sportsmen's News for the Outdoor Channel (playing a mock news co-anchor). In early 2007, Makinson starred as Carly Barzak in the short-lived series, Halfway Home.

In December 2007, she appeared in TV commercials for Toshiba HDTV that cross-promoted the movie Shrek the Third.

Makinson played Lauren Ackerman in the Nickelodeon series iCarly entitled "iHave a Lovesick Teacher" who is Carly, Sam, and Freddie's teacher. She briefly reappears at the end of "iStage an Intervention" . She also appears in the True Jackson, VP episode "Trapped in Paris" as a rude airline passenger, and Liquid Plumr's "Double Impact" commercial as an overheated shopper.

References

External links

Biography at Comedy Central

1978 births
Arizona State University alumni
American television actresses
American stand-up comedians
American voice actresses
Actresses from Arizona
American women comedians
Living people
People from Tempe, Arizona
21st-century American comedians
21st-century American actresses